The 1991 winners of the Torneo di Viareggio (in English, the Viareggio Tournament, officially the Viareggio Cup World Football Tournament Coppa Carnevale), the annual youth football tournament held in Viareggio, Tuscany, are listed below.

Format
The 24 teams are seeded in 6 knockout groups. The winner of each group and two lucky losers progress to the final knockout stage. The final round matches include 30 minutes extra time and penalties to be played if the draw between teams still holds. The semifinals losing sides play consolation final. The winning teams play the final with extra time and repeat the match if the draw holds.

Participating teams
Italian teams

  Atalanta
  Bari
  Bologna
  Cesena
  Cremonese
  Fiorentina
  Inter Milan
  Juventus
  Lazio
  Milan
  Napoli
  Parma
  Pescara
  Roma
  Torino
  Udinese
  Viareggio

European teams

  Zurich
  Aston Villa
  Metz
  Dinamo Kiev
  Spartak Moscow
  Honved

American teams
  Toronto

Group stage

Group A

Group B

Group C

Group D

Group E

Group F

Knockout stage

Champions

Footnotes

External links
 Official Site (Italian)
 Results on RSSSF.com

1990
1991–92 in Italian football
1991–92 in English football
1991–92 in French football
1991–92 in Swiss football
1991–92 in Hungarian football
1991 in Soviet football
1991 in Canadian soccer